Yevgeny Lazarev may refer to:

Yevgeni Lazarev (Yevgeni Nikolayevich Lazarev, 1937–2016), Russian-American film actor